Menegazzia neozelandica is a species of foliose lichen from New Zealand, Australia, and South America. It was first described by Austrian botanist Alexander Zahlbruckner in 1929 as Parmelia neozelandica. Peter James transferred it to the genus Menegazzia in 1992.

See also
 List of Menegazzia species

References

neozelandica
Lichen species
Lichens described in 1992
Lichens of Australia
Lichens of New Zealand
Lichens of South America
Taxa named by Alexander Zahlbruckner